Local Progressive Party is a Thai political party founded on 15 March 1971 by Chumnan Yuvaboon is leader and Ram Bunyaprasob is secretary-general. Main policy of party is build local government unit to strong.

Party leadership

References

External links 

 สุจิต บุญบงการ, การพัฒนาการเมืองของไทย: ปฏิสัมพันธ์ระหว่างทหาร สถาบันทางการเมือง และการมีส่วนร่วมทางการเมืองของประชาชน, กรุงเทพฯ: สำนักพิมพ์จุฬาลงกรณ์มหาวิทยาลัย, 2531
 เสริมศักดิ์ พงษ์พานิช, การสมัครรับเลือกตั้งในนามของพรรคการเมืองในประเทศไทย, วิทยานิพนธ์หลักสูตรชั้นปริญญาโท ภาค 2 ทางรัฐศาสตร์ คณะรัฐศาสตร์ มหาวิทยาลัยธรรมศาสตร์, 2519

Defunct political parties in Thailand